Liu Xi (died 193BC), better known by his courtesy name Liu Zhong, was an elder brother of Emperor Gaozu, founder of China's Han dynasty. He served as marquess of Hexin, king or prince of Dai, and marquess of Heyang.

Life
Liu Xi was the son of the man known to history as Liu Taigong. His elder brother, Liu Bo, (t s Liú Bó) died young, leaving Liu Xi the eldest male in the family of Liu Bang, who became the first Han emperor of China and was posthumously known as Emperor Gaozu ("High Ancestor").

After Liu Bang's establishment of the Han, Liu Xi was created Marquess of Hexin.

In 201BC, King Xin of Han—who had been removed by the emperor from his native land to rule over the northern border from Mayi—defected to the Xiongnu. Liu Xi was named King or Prince of Dai in his place. This territory spread over the three northern commanderies of Dai, Yanmen, and Yunzhong and formed the front line between the Han state and the nomads of the Eurasian steppe. Liu Xi fled to Luoyang by himself before a Xiongnu attack in the 12th month of the 7th year of Liu Bang's reign (200BC).

Following this display of cowardice, Liu Xi was replaced in Dai and demoted to Marquess of Heyang (t s Héyáng), a county southeast of present-day Heyang County.

In 195BC, Liu Xi's son Prince Pi was made Prince or King of Wu.

Liu Xi died in 193BC and was subsequently honored under the posthumous name of the "Qing" or "Momentary King".

References

Citations

Sources 

 . 
 .
 .
 .

193 BC deaths
Han dynasty imperial princes
Year of birth unknown
Emperor Gaozu of Han